Zlatko Runje (born 9 December 1979) is a Croatian retired footballer who played as a goalkeeper. He is currently the goalkeeping coach of Prva HNL side Hajduk Split.

Personal life
He is the younger brother of Vedran Runje, also the former professional football goalkeeper.

External links
 
 Zlatko Runje profile at Nogometni Magazin 

1979 births
Living people
People from Sinj
Association football goalkeepers
Croatian footballers
HNK Hajduk Split players
K.A.A. Gent players
NK Varaždin players
HNK Šibenik players
Panthrakikos F.C. players
NK Junak Sinj players
NK Solin players
NK Konavljanin players
NK Hrvace players
Croatian Football League players
Belgian Pro League players
Super League Greece players
First Football League (Croatia) players
Croatian expatriate footballers
Expatriate footballers in Belgium
Croatian expatriate sportspeople in Belgium
Expatriate footballers in Greece
Croatian expatriate sportspeople in Greece
Association football goalkeeping coaches
HNK Hajduk Split non-playing staff